Sloup v Čechách is a municipality and village in Česká Lípa District in the Liberec Region of the Czech Republic. It has about 700 inhabitants. The area of the village is well preserved and is protected by law as a village monument zone.

Geography
It lies in the Ralsko Uplands. In the southern part of the municipal territory there is a sandstone rock town.

History

The first written mention of Sloup v Čechách is from 1318. There was a customs office on an old trade route from Prague to Zittau. In 1595, the Berka of Dubá family had a new manor house built. The greatest development of the village occurred after 1726, during the rule of Count Josef Jan Maxmilián Kinsky, who turned the estate into an important centre of industry and craft.

From 1870, Sloup v Čechách became a holiday resort with a number of number of recreational facilities. After the World War II, the German population was expelled. From 1981 to 1990, Sloup v Čechách was an administrative part of Nový Bor.

Demographics

Sights

Sloup v Čechách is known for the Sloup Castle.

Sloup Chateau was built by Count Kinsky in 1730–1733. Today the Baroque chateau serves as a retirement home.

The Church of Saint Catherine of Alexandria was originally built in the 14th century. The current church was built in 1707–1719. A Marian column from 1694 stands in front of the church.

There are many well-preserved half-timbered houses in the village.

In popular culture
The fairytale film Give the Devil His Due was partly shot in the municipality.

Notable people
Ferdinand Břetislav Mikovec (1826–1862), writer and historian

Twin towns – sister cities

Sloup v Čechách is twinned with:
 Stolpen, Germany

References

External links

Sloup Castle official website

Villages in Česká Lípa District
Populated places in Česká Lípa District